Faisal Naseem (born 20 July 1973) is a Maldivian politician who is Vice President of the Maldives, following the election of President Ibrahim Mohamed Solih on 23 September 2018. He assumed office on 17 November 2018, and succeeded the former Vice President Abdulla Jihad. Prior to his election, Naseem served for many years in the social sector, particularly in tourism.

Vice President Faisal fulfilled the responsibilities of the President for 3 hours and 30 minutes on 25th February 2022. He is the longest serving vice president in Maldivian history as of 2023.

Early life

Faisal Naseem was born in the Funaadu division of the Maldives, on Fuvahmulah Island, on 20 July 1973. In 1986, at age 12, Naseem joined the social sector. Naseem went on to complete his higher studies in the United Kingdom, receiving a bachelor's degree in Hospitality and Tourism Management from the University of Birmingham, and a master's degree in Business Administration from the Cardiff Metropolitan University.

Career

Prior to studying in England, Naseem joined the hospitality industry, serving in positions ranging from assistant manager to general manager. He joined the hospitality industry to become better familiar with his field of choice, which is where he would spend the majority of his career. In recognition of his work, Naseem was awarded the National Youth Award in social services in 1999, and received a “Special Recognition” award in 2015. In 2014, he was named a Disability Ambassador.

Faisal Naseem is also a craftsman, architect and interior designer, and has previously worked on the construction of various guesthouses, resorts and residences.

Politics

Naseem entered the political field in 2004, becoming one of the members to represent the Fuvahmulah Constituency during the drafting of a new constitution from 2004 - 2008. After the constitution's successful completion, he stayed away from politics for the next 5 years. He rejoined the parliament again in 2014, serving as the MP for Kaashidhoo. On 13 July 2018, Naseem was chosen as Ibrahim Mohamed Solih's vice presidential candidate for the 2018 presidential election.

References

1973 births
Maldivian expatriates in the United Kingdom
Maldivian politicians
Vice presidents of the Maldives
Living people